There have been three ships of the United States Navy named USS Saint Paul for Saint Paul, Minnesota:

 , a former passenger liner which was refitted into a Saint Louis-class auxiliary cruiser and was in commission in 1898, and again from 1917 to 1919.
 , another Baltimore-class heavy cruiser in commission from 1945 to 1971.

Additionally, two ships of the U.S. Navy have been named for both of the "Twin Cities" (Minneapolis and Saint Paul, Minnesota) together:

 , the 21st , in commission from 1984 to 2008.
  is a planned .

See also

United States Navy ship names